Events from the year 1635 in art.

Events
Nicolas Poussin begins work on The Triumph of Pan and The Triumph of Bacchus to decorate Cardinal Richelieu's château.
Joyous Entries of Cardinal-Infante Ferdinand of Austria into Antwerp and Ghent.

Works

 Gerard ter Borch – Consultation
 Abraham Bosse – Der Ball ("The Ball")
 Chen Hongshou – Self-portrait
 Philippe de Champaigne – Louis XIII Crowned by Victory
 Dirck van Delen – Palace Courtyard with Figures
 Jan van Goyen – Landscape with travellers outside a tavern
 Juan Bautista Mayno – The Recovery of Bahía de Todos los Santos
 Rembrandt
The Rape of Ganymede
Belshazzar's Feast
Portrait of a Young Man with a Golden Chain (attributed)
The Sacrifice of Abraham
Self-portrait wearing a white feathered bonnet (Buckland Abbey, England)
 Guido Reni – Saint Matthew and the Angel
 Peter Paul Rubens
 The Garden of Love (1630–1635)
 The Three Graces
 John Souch – Sir Thomas Aston at his Wife's Deathbed
 Nicholas Stone – marble effigy of Elizabeth Carey, Lady Berkeley (St Dunstan's church, Cranford, England)
 Justus Sustermans – Portrait of Galileo
 David Teniers – Temptations of Saint Anthony
 Diego Velázquez
Equestrian Portrait of Philip III
Equestrian Portrait of Prince Balthasar Charles
Philip IV in Brown and Silver
Portrait of the Count-Duke of Olivares
Prince Balthasar Charles as a Hunter
The Surrender of Breda

Births
21 February – Thomas Flatman, English poet and miniature painter (died 1688)
16 April  – Frans van Mieris, Sr., Dutch genre and portrait painter (died 1681)
7 October – Roger de Piles, French painter, engraver, art critic and diplomat (died 1709)
11 November – Justus Danckerts, Dutch engraver (died 1701)
date unknown
José Antolínez, Spanish painter (died 1675)
Pietro Santi Bartoli, Italian engraver, draughtsman and painter (died 1700)
Sebastiano Bombelli, Italian Baroque painter, mainly in Venice (died 1719)
Giuseppe Bonati, Italian painter, active in Rome and Ferrara (died 1681)
Guillaume Chasteau, French engraver (died 1683)
Alonso del Arco, Spanish painter (died 1704)
Ricardo do Pilar, Brazilian monk and painter (died 1700)
Giovanni Giacomo Borni, Italian painter active in Lombard (died 1700)
Pedro Nuñez de Villavicencio, Spanish painter (died 1700)
Henri Gascar, French painter (died 1701)
Antonio Giorgetti, Italian sculptor (died 1669)
Basilio Santa Cruz Pumacallao, Quechua painter from Cusco, Peru (died 1710)
Pieter van Anraedt, Dutch Golden Age painter of history scenes (died 1678)
Domenicus van Tol, Dutch Golden Age painter (died 1676)

Deaths
14 March – Jacques Callot, printmaker and draughtsman from Lorraine (born 1592)
17 May – Domenico Tintoretto, Venetian painter, son of Jacopo Tintoretto (born 1560)
30 September – Kanō Sanraku, Japanese painter (born 1559)
25 December – Samuel de Champlain, French cartographer, draughtsman, navigator, soldier, explorer, ethnologist, diplomat, geographer, chronicler and founder of Québec City (born 1567)
date unknown
Reza Abbasi, Persian miniaturist, painter and calligrapher of the Isfahan School (born 1565)
Camillo Berlinghieri, Italian painter of the Baroque period (born 1590/1605)
Krzysztof Boguszewski, Polish Baroque painter (born unknown)
Battistello Caracciolo, Italian painter (born 1578)
Giovanni Battista Crescenzi, Italian painter and architect (born 1577)
Willem Cornelisz Duyster, Dutch painter from Amsterdam (born 1599)
Francesco Lauri, Italian fresco painter (born 1610)
Giulio Parigi, Italian architect and designer (born 1571)
Fabrizio Santafede, Italian late-Mannerist painter (born 1560)
probable – Giuseppe Vermiglio, Northern Italian Caravaggisti painter (born 1585)

References

 
Years of the 17th century in art
1630s in art